Tuxedo Park is a neighborhood of Atlanta in the Buckhead area of the city. The area is National Register of Historic Places NRHP-listed (no. 80004665). 

One-time Atlanta mayor Robert Maddox's house "Woodhaven" was located in the area from 1911 to 1963, when the present Georgia Governor's Mansion was built here.

The neighborhood is part of NPU A and is bounded by:
 Blackland Road and Putnam Drive and the neighborhood of Chastain Park on the north
 Northside Drive and the Kingswood neighborhood on the west
 Moore's Mill Road and the Argonne Forest neighborhood on the south
 Habersham Road and the South Tuxedo Park neighborhood on the southeast
Lake Forest Drive and the East Chastain Park neighborhood on the northeast

Residents
 Kelly Loeffler, United States Senator from Georgia (2020-2021)

References

External links
 - detailed information about history and architecture

Neighborhoods in Atlanta